Dmitri Gromov  may refer to:

 Dmitri Gromov (figure skater) (born 1967), Russian figure skater 
 Dmitri Gromov (ice hockey) (born 1991), Russian ice hockey player